Dixieland Band (1980 – April 7, 2010) was an American Thoroughbred racehorse and sire.

Background
Dixieland Band was bred by Bayard Sharp, a prominent and highly respected Delaware horseman and president of The Blood-Horse Inc.  Out of the Sharp-owned multiple stakes winning mare, Mississippi Mud, he was a son of the 20th century's most influential sire, Northern Dancer.

Racing career
In May 1983, Dixieland Band won the Pennsylvania Derby by a neck from Jacques Tip, establishing himself as a contender for the Belmont Stakes. In the Belmont, he finished unplaced behind Caveat.

At age four, he won June's Massachusetts Handicap by two and a quarter lengths from Ward Off Trouble. He was retired after the 1984 racing season to stand at his owner's stud farm in Middletown, Delaware.

Stud record
A very successful stallion, as of early 2008 Dixieland Band has sired 114 stakes race winners and 43 Graded stakes race winners, of which five have each earned more than $1 million. In addition, Dixieland Band is the damsire of two Kentucky Derby winners: Monarchos in 2001 and Street Sense in 2007. He is also the damsire of Including, Big Truck, and the 2007 Australian Champion Stayer, Delta Blues.

Owner Bayard Sharp's daughter Sarah is married to prominent Kentucky horseman William S. Farish III. Sharp died in 2002, and Dixieland Band stood at the Farish family's Lane's End Farm in Versailles. Among his progeny were Drum Taps, Bowman's Band, Citidancer, Dixie Brass, and Dixie Union.

At the end of the 2008 breeding season, Dixieland Band was pensioned from stud duties. He was euthanized due to the infirmities of old age on April 7, 2010.

Pedigree

References

 Dixieland Band's pedigree and partial racing stats
 Dixieland at Stallion Register online

1980 racehorse births
2010 racehorse deaths
Racehorses bred in Maryland
Racehorses trained in the United States
United States Champion Thoroughbred Sires
American Champion Thoroughbred broodmare sires
Thoroughbred family 4-m